Union sportive de la Médina Khenchela, known as USM Khenchela  or simply USMK for short, is an Algerian football club based in Khenchela. The club was founded in 1943 and its colours are white and black. Their home stadium, Amar Hamam Stadium, has a capacity of 5,000 spectators. The club is currently playing in the Algerian Ligue Professionnelle 1.

History 
The club came fifth in the 2009–10 Ligue Inter-Régions de football – Groupe Est.

The club was promoted for the 2010–11 season of the newly created Championnat National de Football Amateur due to the professionalisation of the first two divisions in Algeria.

On August 5, 2020, USM Khenchela promoted to the Algerian Ligue 2.

On May 21, 2022, USM Khenchela promoted to the Algerian Ligue Professionnelle 1.

Players

Algerian teams are limited to two foreign players. The squad list includes only the principal nationality of each player;

Current squad

Personnel

Current technical staff

References

External links 

 USM Khenchela profile at goalzz.com
 USM Khenchela profile at fr.soccerway.com/

Football clubs in Algeria
Khenchela Province
Association football clubs established in 1943
1943 establishments in Algeria
Sports clubs in Algeria
USM Khenchela
Algerian Ligue Professionnelle 1 clubs